Alexandre Rouleau (born July 29, 1983) is a Canadian former professional ice hockey player. Former General Manager of major junior team in which he played, the Val-d'Or Foreurs of the Quebec Major Junior Hockey League. He is currently amateur scout for the Chicago Blackhawks.

Playing career
Rouleau was drafted by the Pittsburgh Penguins of the National Hockey League in the 2001 NHL Entry Draft. After spending four years between the ECHL and the AHL, Rouleau headed to Europe to play for Briançon of France's Ligue Magnus.

After a season with Briançon, Rouleau joined Brûleurs de Loups in 2008. Rouleau was named Alternate Captain for Brûleurs de Loups during the 2010–11 and 2011-12 seasons. Rouleau competed in the 2012 IIHF World Championship as a member of the France men's national ice hockey team.

After being in negotiations with Västerås and agreeing to a contract on April 17, 2012, Rouleau retired from professional hockey on August 10, 2012 to become a general manager of the Val-d'Or Foreurs of the QMJHL, the team that Rouleau played for from 2000 until 2003.

Awards and accomplishments
2000–01: QMJHL Champion
2002–03: QMJHL Second All-Star Team
2002–03: U20 WJC Silver Medal
2008–09: French All-Star Team
2008–09: French Champion (Grenoble)
2008–09: French Cup Champion (Grenoble)
2008–09: French League Cup Champion (Grenoble)
2009–10: French All-Star Team
2009–10: French League Most Points by Defenseman (26)
2010–11: French League Cup Champion (Grenoble)

Career statistics

Regular season and playoffs

International

References

External links

1983 births
Living people
Brûleurs de Loups players
Canadian expatriate ice hockey players in France
Canadian ice hockey defencemen
Chicago Blackhawks scouts
Diables Rouges de Briançon players
People from Mont-Laurier
Phoenix RoadRunners players
Pittsburgh Penguins draft picks
Quebec Remparts players
San Antonio Rampage players
Val-d'Or Foreurs players
Wheeling Nailers players
Wilkes-Barre/Scranton Penguins players